Andrea Guatelli (born 5 May 1984) is an Italian professional footballer who plays goalkeeper.

Career
Born in Parma, Guatelli has played for Parma, Portsmouth, Oxford United, FC Zürich and FC Chiasso.

He signed a two-year contract with Portsmouth in August 2004 following a trial with the club. He moved on loan to Oxford United in March 2006, along with fellow Portsmouth player Liam Horsted. He was one of 7 player released by Portsmouth in May 2006 following the expiry of their contracts.

References

1984 births
Living people
Italian footballers
Parma Calcio 1913 players
Portsmouth F.C. players
Oxford United F.C. players
FC Zürich players
FC Chiasso players
FC Rapperswil-Jona players
English Football League players
Swiss Super League players
Swiss Challenge League players
Association football goalkeepers
Italian expatriate footballers
Expatriate footballers in England
Expatriate footballers in Switzerland